Shwebo University is a public liberal arts university located in Shwebo, Myanmar. The university offers bachelor's, master's degree program in common liberal arts, sciences.

History
Shwebo University was established as Shwebo Regional College, an affiliated college of Mandalay College (now Mandalay University) in 1977. It is also named  as Shwebo College in 1980, Shwebo Degree College in 1999. In 2011, it became Shwebo University.

Programs
Classified as an Arts and Science university in the Burmese university education system, Shwebo University offers bachelor's and master's degree programs in common liberal arts and sciences disciplines. Its regular Bachelor of Arts (BA) and Bachelor of Science (BSc) take four years to complete and honours degree programs BA (Hons) and BSc (Hons) take five years..

References

External links 

Arts and Science universities in Myanmar
Universities and colleges in Myanmar